Harry Johnston (1858–1927) was a British explorer, botanist and colonial administrator.

Harry Johnston may also refer to:
Harry Johnston (surveyor) (1853–1915), Australian Surveyor General
Harry Johnston (American politician) (born 1931), American politician
Harry Johnston (footballer, born 1871) (1871–1936), Scottish footballer (Sunderland AFC)
Harry Johnston (footballer, born 1919) (1919–1973), English footballer (Blackpool FC, national team)
Harry Johnston (footballer, born 1949), Scottish footballer (Montrose, Partick) and cricketer
Harry Johnston (Irish footballer), Irish footballer, active in the 1920s
Harry Johnston (Canadian politician) (1887–1943), British Columbia MLA
H. H. Johnston (American football), head football coach for the Doane College Tigers

See also
Harold Johnston (disambiguation)
Harry Johnson (disambiguation)
Henry Johnston (disambiguation)
Harry Johnstone, English footballer